Clare Husted Mountbatten, Marchioness of Milford Haven (née Steel; born 2 September 1960), is a British aristocrat, journalist and polo player. She held the position of Social Editor for Tatler magazine from 1995 to 2005. She is the co-founder and trustee of James' Place, a charity dedicated to prevent male suicide. She founded the organisation with Nick Wentworth-Stanley, following the tragic loss by suicide of their son, James.

Biography
Lady Milford Haven is the daughter of Anthony Nigel Steel of Rock House Farm, Lower Froyle, Hampshire (1925–1983), and his wife, Anne Husted.

She has one brother and one sister. Her brother, Timothy Michael Steel (born 1952), married The Hon. Sophia-Rose Maude (daughter of Robert  Maude, 8th Viscount Hawarden) on 26 June 1982; they have four children. Her sister, Louise Helen Steel (born 1956), married Count Don Ludovico del Balzo, dei Duchi di Presenzano, son of Count Don Giulio del Balzo, dei Duchi di Presenzano and Donna Maria Elisabetta, dei Marchese Cavalletti dell'Oliveto Sabino, on 30 April 1983; they have three children.

Marriages and children
She married Nicholas Philip Wentworth-Stanley (born 1954), a Lloyd's List's underwriter, in 1985; they later divorced in 1997. With her first husband, she had three children:
 James Nicholas (Nick) Wentworth-Stanley (1985 – 15 December 2006), a former pupil at Harrow School and a student at Newcastle University and, like his mother, an accomplished polo player
 Harry David Wentworth-Stanley (born 1989), married to Cressida Bonas
 Louisa Clare Wentworth-Stanley (born 1993), engaged to Ludovic de Ferranti

She married The 4th Marquess of Milford Haven in Nantucket, Nantucket County, Massachusetts, on 20 August 1997, without issue.

References

Milford Haven, Clare Mountbatten, Marchioness of
Milford Haven, Clare Mountbatten, Marchioness of
Milford Haven, Clare Mountbatten, Marchioness of
Living people
Clare Mountbatten, Marchioness of Milford Haven
British magazine editors
British polo players
British philanthropists
People from Froyle